Debashree Mazumdar (born 6 April 1991) is an Indian sprint athlete from Kolkata who specializes in 4 × 400 metres relay races.

Career 
Debashree Mazumdar works for the Income Tax department as an  Income Tax Inspector in Delhi.

In 2017 she was part of the winning 4 × 400 m relay team at the 2017 Asian Athletics Championships in Bhubaneshwar along with M. R. Poovamma, Jisna Mathew and Nirmala Sheoran.

References

External links
 

Living people
1991 births
Athletes from Kolkata
Indian female sprinters
Indian female hurdlers
20th-century Indian women
20th-century Indian people
Commonwealth Games competitors for India
Athletes (track and field) at the 2010 Commonwealth Games
Athletes (track and field) at the 2014 Commonwealth Games
Bengali sportspeople
Sportswomen from Kolkata